Azadvar (also Romanized as Āzādvar) is a village in Pain Jovin Rural District, Helali District, Joghatai County, Razavi Khorasan Province, Iran.

Population
At the 2006 census, its population was 1,720, in 388 families.

See also 

 List of cities, towns and villages in Razavi Khorasan Province

References 

Populated places in Joghatai County
Populated places in Iran